The Donglong Temple is one of the most prominent temple in Donggang Township, Pingtung County, Taiwan. The temple is dedicated to "Lord Wen" (溫王爺; Wēn wángyé, the word Wen is pronounced the same as "plague" in Chinese).

History
The temple was originally built in 1706 in the fishing village of Yanpu, across the river from Donggang. However, it was then later damaged by a flood in 1790 which led to a relocation of the temple to Donggang in 1790. Then again, it was damaged by another flood in 1877. Reconstruction work at the current site started in 1884 and was completed in 1887.

Activities
The temple organizes the Donggang King Boat Ceremony every three years on the 2nd, 5th, 8th and 11th year of the Chinese calendar.

See also
 Wang Ye worship
 Chinese folk religion
 List of temples in Taiwan
 List of tourist attractions in Taiwan

References

1706 establishments in Taiwan
Religious buildings and structures completed in 1706
Temples in Pingtung County
Taoist temples in Taiwan